Pallavi Patil is an Indian actress. She debuted with the Marathi film Classmates, Patil has starred in several Marathi films including 702 Dixit's, Shentimental, and Tu Tithe Asave and John Abraham's Marathi film production Savita Damodar Paranjpe.

Early life 
Patil was born on 4 November 1991 in Dhule, Maharashtra and brought up in Jalgaon. She completed schooling from Sarvoday Madhyamik Vidyalaya, Ghude near Bhadgaon and has a degree from D.Y. Patil College of Architecture Pune.

Career 
Patil participated in a beauty pageant organized by 9X Jhakaas channel. Patil was the runner-up and consequentially landed the role of 'Heena' in Aditya Sarpotdar's multi-starrer Classmates alongside Ankush Chaudhari, Sai Tamhankar, and Sonalee Kulkarni. Her performance in Classmates landed here a role in Director Shankh Rajadhyaksha's Marathi suspense thriller 702 Dixits. Patil has also appeared in Abhinay Deo's Hindi TV series 24, starring Anil Kapoor, where she portrayed the character of Mitali. In 2017, Pallavi starred alongside Ashok Saraf, Raghubir Yadav and Pushkar Shrotri in the Marathi comedy film Shentimental.

Filmography

Films

Television

Web series

References

External links
 

Marathi actors
Actresses in Marathi cinema
Indian film actresses
Living people
People from Pune
Actresses in Hindi cinema
1991 births
People from Dhule district
People from Dhule
People from Maharashtra